Valeri Pavlovich Maslov (28 April 1940 – 27 July 2017) was a Soviet football and bandy player.

Honours

Football 
 Soviet Top League winner: 1963.
 Soviet Top League runner-up: 1962, 1967, 1970.
 Soviet Cup winner: 1967, 1970.

Bandy 
Played for Trud Kaliningrad (1960–1961), Dynamo Moscow (1961–1979).

 Soviet Bandy League winner: 1963-1965, 1967, 1970, 1972, 1973, 1975, 1976, 1978.
 Soviet Bandy League runner-up: 1966, 1968, 1971, 1974, 1977.
 Soviet Bandy League bronze: 1962.
 Bandy Champions Cup winner: 1976, 1977, 1979.
 Bandy World Championship winner: 1961, 1963, 1965, 1967, 1971, 1973, 1975, 1977.
 Bandy World Championship best forward: 1973.
 Soviet Top forward: 1970, 1973.

Bandy (as a coach) 
Coached Yunost Omsk (1987–1989), Stroitel Syktyvkar (1992–1997), Agrokhim Berezniki (1998–2000), Russian Under-21 national bandy team (1993–1996).

 Russian Bandy League runner-up: 1993.
 Bandy Under-21 World Championship winner: 1994.

International career
Maslov made his debut for USSR football team on 20 May 1964 in a friendly against Uruguay. He played in the qualifiers for UEFA Euro 1968, but was not selected for the final tournament squad.

References

External links
  Profile

1940 births
People from Kamchatka Krai
2017 deaths
Soviet footballers
Soviet Union international footballers
Soviet football managers
Soviet bandy players
Soviet Top League players
FC Dynamo Moscow players
FC Spartak Vladikavkaz managers
Dynamo Moscow players
Association football midfielders
Deaths from cerebrovascular disease
FC Dynamo Vologda players
FC Dynamo Makhachkala players
Neurological disease deaths in Russia